The 2006 Internazionali Femminili di Palermo was a women's tennis tournament played on outdoor clay courts in Palermo, Italy that was part of the Tier IV category of the 2006 WTA Tour. It was the 19th edition of the Internazionali Femminili di Palermo and took place from 17 July until 23 July 2006. Second-seeded Anabel Medina Garrigues won the singles title, her third consecutive at the event and fourth in total, and earned $22,900 first-prize money.

Finals

Singles

 Anabel Medina Garrigues defeated  Tathiana Garbin, 6–4, 6–4
 It was Medina Garrigues' 2nd singles title of the year and the 6th of her career.

Doubles

 Janette Husárová /  Michaëlla Krajicek defeated  Alice Canepa /  Giulia Gabba, 6–0, 6–0

References

External sources
 ITF tournament edition details
 Tournament draws

Torneo Internazionali Femminili di Palermo
Torneo Internazionali Femminili di Palermo
Internazionali Femminili di Palermo
Torneo